Ngugi wa Mirii (1951 – 2/3 May 2008) was a Kenyan-Zimbabwean playwright, social worker and teacher, most known for his play Ngaahika Ndeenda, which he co-authored with fellow Gikuyu writer Ngũgĩ wa Thiong'o. The play depicts the injustices and excesses of post-colonial Kenya, and was staged by non-intellectuals in an open-air theatre at the Kamirithu Educational and Cultural Center in Limuru.

Early life
Born in Roromo, Limuru, Kenya, Ngugi wa Mirii was the second born in a family of six children born to John Mirii and Elizabeth Wanjiku. He was educated at Ngenia Secondary School and from 1972 to 1974 worked with the Kenya Posts and Telecommunications Corporation. He obtained a diploma in Adult Education at the Institute of Adult Studies, Nairobi University, and then joined the Institute of Development Studies. While working there he became involved with peasants and workers in community development at Kamiriithu, Limuru.

Playwright 
In 1977, Ngugi wa Mirii and Ngugi wa Thiong'o co-authored a play titled Ngaahika Ndeenda (I Will Marry When I Want). Both playwrights were arrested six weeks after the play debuted, and detained in prison.

Five years later, their next play Mother Cry for Me, forced both playwrights into exile, with Ngugi wa Mirii settling in Zimbabwe while Ngugi wa Thiong'o fled first to Britain, and then to the United States.

Exile 
In 1982, Ngugi wa Mirii fled to Zimbabwe where he lived in exile. Ngugi wa Mirii was joined a year later by his wife, Wairimu wa Ngugi and one-year old daughter, Elizabeth Wanjiku Ngugi. He then joined Zimbabwean Foundation for Education with Production (ZIMFEP) where he worked for several years.

In Zimbabwe, he wrote extensively about the Pan-African cause. In 1985, he was awarded funding to found the Zimbabwean Association of Community Theatre. He was granted Zimbabwean citizenship shortly after.

Ngugi wa Mirii was known as a supporter of Robert Mugabe and Zanu-PF.

Death 
On 3 May 2008, Ngugi wa Mirii died in a car accident in Zimbabwe, after he drove into a stationary lorry nearby the suburb of Eastlea. He was 57 at the time.

Works 

 Ngaahika Ndeenda (I Will Marry When I Want), co-written with Ngugi wa Thiong'o (1977)

References 

Kenyan writers
1951 births
2008 deaths
Road incident deaths in Zimbabwe
Kikuyu-language writers
People from Kiambu County